Jeromes Dream is a screamo band from Connecticut, originally active from 1997 to 2001, and again from 2018 onwards.

History
Jeromes Dream began on September 13, 1997 after a short jam session between bassist Jeff Smith, guitarist Nick Antonopoulos, and drummer Erik Ratensperger that was held in the basement of Antonopoulos' mother's house. According to Erik Ratensperger, their first recorded material was intended to be used for a demo release; however, it caught the attention of Rice Control Records, resulting in the intended demo material being released as a split album with Amalgamation.

Most of the band's music was released as splits with other artists, including other notable screamo acts such as Usurp Synapse. Their most well known split release would be their split with Orchid, a 10" record shaped in a 3/4ths view of a skull, which is sought after by both collectors and fans alike, and is considered a definitive work of the genre. They toured the United States frequently, and their first proper full-length album, titled Seeing Means More Than Safety, was released in May 2000.
 
Their second full-length, Presents, was released on July 9, 2001, which featured a significant change in sound for the band. They would eventually break up in August that same year. Jeff Smith would later begin a career in experimental drone music by creating the band The Wind-Up Bird with Joseph Grimm. Erik Ratensperger eventually became the drummer for The Virgins, a dance punk band from New York.

Along with artists such as Orchid, Saetia and Pg. 99, they are considered as one of the most influential bands of the late 1990s screamo movement and have been called as "probably the most original" band of their time. Their music has influenced many bands, such as Lord Snow, Brighter Arrows, and Vein.

In mid-2016 Ratensperger posted a previously unreleased video on the new official Jeromes Dream youtube page. He has also opened up an official Jeromes Dream archivial Instagram page for the purpose of mostly uploading previously unreleased photos of the group. In the spring of 2017, it was announced that Zegema Beach Records and Coniine Records will put out a Jeromes Dream tribute compilation, titled It's More Like A Homage To You, with all proceeds made off of it going to Flint, Michigan. The compilation will feature covers done by 29 bands from multiple countries.

On September 3, 2017, it was announced through Jeromes Dream's official Instagram account that all three members of Jeromes Dream had talked for the first time since their disbandment that day through a three hour phone call, all of which was recorded by drummer Erik Ratensperger, and later posted on the band's YouTube channel.

Reunion
On March 5, 2018, Jeromes Dream created a new website, jeromesdreamforever.com, featuring a mailing list. On March 8, the band posted a YouTube video, titled 'Something is happening.', linking to their website.

On March 22, 2018, Jeromes Dream announced that they were writing a new full-length album, which was set to be recorded in the fall of 2018 by Kurt Ballou at GodCity Studios.
This record would be self-released, and to finance this the band set up an Indiegogo crowdfunding campaign as a pre-order for the record. In less than 24 hours 90% of their $15,000 goal was reached, and in less than 4 days 100% of the goal was reached.

The LP is confirmed no longer to be recorded by Kurt Ballou, but instead by Jack Shirley, at Atomic Garden studios. It was released on July 19, 2019. Later in January 2019 it was announced that the reformed group will tour with Loma Prieta in the summer of that year.

On July 30, 2021, Jeromes Dream announced that they were working with the Boston-based label Iodine Recordings and reissuing their album "Presents" on vinyl for its 20th anniversary. 

On October 3, 2021, Jeromes Dream announced via social media that Sean Leary (Loma Prieta, Ełłe, Stormlight) officially joined the band as second guitarist.

Style and live performances
Vocalist and bassist Jeff Smith would scream from the top of his lungs during live performances without the use of a microphone. During live shows, both Smith and Antonopoulos would perform with their backs facing the audience. They always performed on the floor, and would refuse to play on stage.

Jeromes Dream is mainly categorized as a screamo band. Their music includes influences from powerviolence, grindcore, noise rock, and math rock. Their first full length, Seeing Means More Than Safety, was very violent and destructive musically, and included many noise interludes composed of guitar feedback and radio samples. Their second full length, Presents, however, was much more angular musically. The vocal style also changed dramatically, having "a more traditional hardcore-shout kind of approach", as described in a review.

Band members
Jeff Smith - vocals, bass
Nick Antonopoulos - guitar
Erik Ratensperger - drums
Sean Leary - guitar (2021–present)

Discography

Studio albums

Split releases

Compilation albums

Compilation appearances

References

External links
 
 Official Jeromes Dream Instagram Page
 Discogs Page, Including Pressing Information
 Alone Records Information On Jeromes Dream

American screamo musical groups